Loryma basalis is a species of moth in the family Pyralidae. It was described by Francis Walker in 1865. It is found in Rwanda, South Africa, Mozambique and the Seychelles.

References

Moths described in 1865
Pyralini
Moths of Africa
Moths of Seychelles